Salisbury High School is a public high school located in Salisbury Township, Pennsylvania in the Lehigh Valley region of eastern Pennsylvania. It is the only high school within the Salisbury Township School District.

As of the 2020-21 school year, the school had an enrollment of 516 students, according to National Center for Education Statistics data.

History
Salisbury Township was founded in 1834. In 1955, the construction for Salisbury High School was planned. Construction started in 1962 and was finished in 1963. Until 2011, Salisbury High School housed grades 10-12, with grade 9 attending Salisbury Middle School. The high school underwent major renovations between 2009 and 2011, which included making space to move the district's 9th grade students into the high school.

Athletics

Districts
Salisbury participates in the Colonial League of the Pennsylvania Interscholastic Athletic Association's District XI. The Colonial League includes Lehigh Valley high schools deemed too small to participate in the East Penn Conference. 

Boys Basketball (1971, 1976, 1987, 1990, 1996, 2010)
Baseball (1980, 1985–1987, 1996, 2003, 2011, 2013)
Boys Soccer (1985-1987, 1992, 2003, 2010)
Rifle Team (2006)
Boys Swimming (2012, 2013, 2014)

Colonial League titles
Boys Basketball (1977, 1978, 1983, 1988, 1990, 1992, 1994, 1996, 2001, 2003, 2011)
Baseball (1978, 1980, 1983, 1986, 1987, 1991, 1993, 1994, 1995, 2009, 2012, 2013)
Girls Basketball (1989, 1990, 1993, 2010)

Eastern Pennsylvania Conference championship
Football (2006)

State championship titles
Swimming (2013)

The school fields teams in most major sports, including boys baseball, boys and girls basketball, boys tennis, cheerleading, girls field hockey, girls softball, football, soccer, rifle, wrestling, and track & field.

Teams
Salisbury has the Colonial League titles in Basketball and Baseball. The Field hockey team has never made a district appearance. The District Swimming Team won districts in 2012.
Salisbury offers twenty-one varsity and twelve junior varsity sport programs.
Varsity

Boys
Baseball - AA
Basketball- AAA
Cross Country - AA
Football - AA
Golf - AA
Rifle - AAAA
Soccer - AA
Swimming and Diving - AA
Tennis - AA
Track and field - AA
Wrestling	- AA

Girls
Basketball - AA
Cheer - AAAA
Cross Country - AA
Field hockey - AA
Golf - AA
Rifle - AAAA
Soccer (Fall) - AA
Softball - AA
Swimming and Diving - AA
Girls' Tennis - AA
Track and Field - AA

Notable alumni
Michael Crowther, wildlife conservationist and former president and chief executive officer, Indianapolis Zoo
Ian Riccaboni, host of All Elite Wrestling's Ring of Honor 
Jason Yeisley, former professional soccer player, FC Dallas, Pittsburgh Riverhounds SC, Reading United AC, and Richmond Kickers

References

External links
Salisbury Township School District official website
Salisbury High School athletics official website
Salisbury High School on Facebook
Salisbury High School at The Express-Times

1963 establishments in Pennsylvania
Educational institutions established in 1963
Public high schools in Pennsylvania
Schools in Lehigh County, Pennsylvania